PTV may refer to:

Television
 "PTV" (Family Guy), a 2005 Family Guy episode
 PTV (PBS), a temporary branding to PBS Kids, used from 1994 to 1999
 PTV (Thailand) or People's Television, a Thailand-based satellite television station
 Pakistan Television Corporation, a state-run broadcaster of Pakistan
 PTV Home, a cable and satellite entertainment channel
 PTV News, a 24-hour state news channel
 Paramount Television, a defunct American television production/distribution company (now CBS Television Studios)
 People's Television Network, a government-owned broadcaster in the Philippines
 Personal televisions, screens located in seat-backs or armrests on passenger aircraft
 Prime7, formerly Prime Television, an Australian television network
 PTV (TV station), a television station in Mildura, Victoria, Australia, which is part of Prime7 
 PTV4 (Paikallistelevisio), a now-defunct Finnish television channel, predecessor of Nelonen

Music
Pierce the Veil, an American post-hardcore/experimental rock band
Psychic TV, a video art and music group

Other
PTV (car), a microcar built in Manresa, Spain
PTV AG, a German software company
Pactiv (NYSE: PTV0), a manufacturer of Hefty products and packaging
Particle tracking velocimetry, a technique to measure velocity of particles
Public Transport Victoria, the statutory body overseeing public transport in Victoria, Australia
Punta toro, a virus